Colony is an Irish documentary film about colony collapse disorder, directed by Carter Gunn and Ross McDonnell. The film was produced by Morgan Bushe and Macdara Kelleher. The music was written by Clogs. It opened theatrically in Los Angeles on 30 July 2010 and New York City on 13 August 2010 at the 14th Annual DocuWeeks.

Plot
The documentary explores the disappearance of millions of bees, known as “colony collapse syndrome."

References

External links
 
 
 
 
 

2009 films
English-language Irish films
Irish documentary films
2009 documentary films
Documentary films about bees
Documentary films about environmental issues
Films about bees
2000s English-language films
English-language documentary films